Battle of Yao may refer to:

Battle of Xiao or Yao, 627 BC in China
Battle of Yao (Japan), 1615